The Ryongchŏn disaster was a train disaster that occurred on 22 April 2004 in the town of Ryongchŏn, North Korea, near the border with the People's Republic of China. At least 54 people were killed, including some Syrian scientists.

The disaster occurred when flammable cargo exploded at Ryongchon Station at around 13:00 local time (04:00 GMT). The news was released by South Korean media outlets, which reported that up to 3,000 people had been killed or injured in the blast and subsequent fires. The North Korean government declared a state of emergency in the region, but little information has been made public by the North Korean government. Shortly after the accident, the North Korean government cut telephone lines to the outside world.

Effects
The Red Cross was allowed into the area, in an unusual concession from the North Korean authorities, becoming the only outside agency to see the disaster area. According to the initial agency report, 160 people were killed and 1,300 were injured in the disaster. However, official casualty reports the following day listed 54 deaths and 1,249 injuries. A wide area was reported to have been affected, with some airborne debris reportedly falling across the border in China. (Satellite pictures published by the BBC purported to show widespread damage in the town, but these were later retracted — they actually show Baghdad from an earlier date, and the strong black-white contrast was misinterpreted.) The Red Cross reported that 1,850 houses and buildings had been destroyed and another 6,350 had been damaged.

On 23 April 2004, the United Nations received an appeal for international aid from North Korea's government. The following day, a few diplomats and aid workers were allowed into the country to assess the disaster.

Cause
The cause and nature of the accident have been the subject of considerable speculation, with several different accounts being reported.
 It was initially reported that the explosion was the result of a collision between two trains carrying gasoline (petrol) and liquified petroleum gas, possibly donated by China to alleviate the ongoing North Korean fuel shortage.
 Diplomats and aid workers in North Korea later suggested that the explosion took place when explosive materials were being shunted in rail cars, possibly being triggered by a collision with a live electric power cable. This is corroborated by reports by North Korean officials to Russia's Itar-Tass news agency, and by government sources to Japan's Kyodo news service. The material was said to be intended for use in canal construction. The official Chinese news agency Xinhua reported that there had been a leak of ammonium nitrate, a substance which is used in some explosives, as a fertilizer, and in rocket fuel. The Sunday Telegraph attributed the disaster to "the explosion of a train carrying ammonium nitrate".
KCNA, the state news service, apparently confirmed the Xinhua report by stating the incident was "due to the electrical contact caused by carelessness during the shunting of wagons loaded with ammonium-nitrate fertilizer".

North Korean leader Kim Jong-il passed through the station several hours before the explosion as he returned from a meeting in China. It was suggested that the explosion might have been an assassination attempt, but South Korean intelligence services believed that it was an accident. One theory is that one of the trains involved was carrying fuel from China. If the incident did involve a train collision, it has been suggested that the cause of the accident may have been a miscommunication related to the changes in train timetables due to Kim Jong-il's itinerary.

Other observers have suggested that the poor state of North Korea's railway system may have contributed to the disaster. It accounts for about 90% of freight transportation; a lack of fuel forces most vehicles off roads.

North Korean government response
According to North Korean defector Thae Yong-ho, Kim Jong-il ordered the execution of several transportation officials after the disaster.

See also
 List of ammonium nitrate disasters
 Transport in North Korea

References

External links
 In pictures: N Korea blast—BBC Photo gallery
 Photo gallery at GlobalSecurity.org
 GlobalSecurity.org report and satellite imagery
 "Reconstruction of Ryongchon"

2004 disasters in North Korea
2004 in North Korea
Ammonium nitrate disasters
April 2004 events in Asia
Explosions in 2004
Explosions in North Korea
Railway accidents and incidents in North Korea
Railway accidents in 2004
Ryongchon